Pim Ronhaar (born 20 July 2001) is a Dutch cyclo-cross and road cyclist, who currently rides for UCI Continental team . He won the gold medal in the men's under-23 event at the 2021 UCI Cyclo-cross World Championships in Ostend.

Major results

Cyclo-cross

2017–2018
 2nd Overall UCI Junior World Cup
1st Koksijde
1st Zeven
3rd Bogense
 3rd Overall Junior Superprestige
1st Zonhoven
1st Gavere
2nd Gieten
3rd Hoogstraten
3rd Middelkerke
 Junior DVV Trophy
2nd Ronse
2nd Essen
2018–2019
 1st  UEC European Junior Championships
 1st  National Junior Championships
 UCI Junior World Cup
1st Koksijde
 Junior Superprestige
3rd Ruddervoorde
3rd Gavere
 Junior Brico Cross
1st Geraardsbergen
2nd Ronse
2019–2020
 3rd National Under-23 Championships
2020–2021
 1st  UCI World Under-23 Championships
2021–2022
 UCI Under-23 World Cup
1st Namur
 1st Overall Under-23 X²O Badkamers Trophy
1st Koppenberg
1st Kortrijk
1st Lille
1st Brussels
2nd Herentals
3rd Baal
 UCI World Cup
3rd Besançon
 Ethias Cross
3rd Essen
2022–2023
 1st Mechelen
 UCI Under-23 World Cup
2nd Maasmechelen

Mountain Bike
2020
 1st  Cross-country, National Under-23 Championships

Road
2022
 1st  Mountains classification, Flèche du Sud

References

External links
 
 

2001 births
Living people
Cyclo-cross cyclists
Dutch male cyclists
Place of birth missing (living people)